William Heritage Winery (formerly known as Heritage Vineyards) is a winery in the Mullica Hill section of Harrison Township in Gloucester County, New Jersey. A family produce farm since 1853, the vineyard was first planted in 1998, and opened to the public in 2002. Heritage is one of the larger winegrowers in New Jersey, having 40 acres of grapes under cultivation, and producing 13,000 cases of wine per year. The winery is named after the family that owns it.

Wines
Heritage Winery is in the Outer Coastal Plain AVA, and produces wine from Cabernet Franc, Cabernet Sauvignon, Chambourcin, Chardonnay, Concord, Grenache, Malbec, Merlot, Muscat blanc, Petit Verdot, Pinot gris, Pinot noir, Sauvignon blanc, Sémillon, and Syrah grapes. Heritage also makes fruit wines from apples, blueberries, peaches, and sugar plums. It is the only winery in New Jersey that produces wine from sugar plums. Heritage is best known for its signature Bordeaux-style wine. The winery was a participant at the Judgment of Princeton, a wine tasting organized by the American Association of Wine Economists that compared New Jersey wines to premium French vintages.

Features, licensing and associations
During the autumn harvest season, Heritage offers pumpkin picking and hayrides, and throughout the year the winery operates a petting zoo and a bistro that sells breads, cheeses, and dips. Heritage has a plenary winery license from the New Jersey Division of Alcoholic Beverage Control, which allows it to produce an unrestricted amount of wine, operate up to 15 off-premises sales rooms, and ship up to 12 cases per year to consumers in-state or out-of-state. The winery is a member of the Garden State Wine Growers Association and the Outer Coastal Plain Vineyard Association.

See also 
 Alcohol laws of New Jersey
 American wine
 Judgment of Princeton
 List of wineries, breweries, and distilleries in New Jersey
 New Jersey Farm Winery Act
 New Jersey Wine Industry Advisory Council
 New Jersey wine

References

External links 
 Garden State Wine Growers Association
 Outer Coastal Plain Vineyard Association

Harrison Township, New Jersey
Wineries in New Jersey
Tourist attractions in Gloucester County, New Jersey